Norvell Lightfoot Henley (May 10, 1869 – March 13, 1923) was an American attorney and politician who served in the Virginia House of Delegates from 1916 until his death in office in 1923.

References

External links 

1869 births
1923 deaths
Democratic Party members of the Virginia House of Delegates
20th-century American politicians
People from James City County, Virginia
College of William & Mary alumni
University of Virginia alumni